Carausius II is the name given by historians to a possible imperial usurper in Roman Britain between the years 354 and 358. Coins appear during this period bearing the name which is the same as an earlier British usurper emperor, Carausius.

No other evidence of Carausius II is known although Roman Britain at the time was an unstable and dangerous place and pretenders to the throne were likely.

Ancient Romans in Britain
4th-century Roman usurpers